Stephen Andrew Bennett (born 13 March 1964) is an Australian politician who is the Liberal National member of the Legislative Assembly of Queensland for Burnett, having won the seat at the 2012 state election.

References

1964 births
Living people
Liberal National Party of Queensland politicians
Members of the Queensland Legislative Assembly
21st-century Australian politicians